A sustainer engine is a rocket engine which remains with a spacecraft during its ascent after booster engines have separated from the spacecraft.

See also 
Multistage rocket

References

Rocket engines